Promised Land is an American drama series which aired on CBS from 1996 to 1999. It is a spin-off from another series, Touched by an Angel.

Series overview

Episodes

Backdoor pilot (1996)

The first episode of the third season of Touched by an Angel, entitled "Promised Land", serves as a backdoor pilot for Promised Land.

Season 1 (1996–97)

Season 2 (1997–98)

Season 3 (1998–99)

See also
List of Touched by an Angel episodes

External links
  
 

Promised Land